Blazing Away is a live album by British singer Marianne Faithfull, released on the Island label in 1990.

Reception

In his review for Allmusic, Ned Raggett notes that "Fully established as a dramatic, innovative singer with astonishing appeal and energy thanks to her string of excellent '80s releases, Faithfull concluded her renaissance decade with Blazing Away, an excellent live album... Faithfull and the players fit hand in glove track for track, with the emphasis on subtler arrangements and performances suiting the hushed, striking atmosphere of the performance".

Track listing
 "Les Prisons du Roy" (Michel Rivgauche, Irving Gordon) – 6:46
 "Strange Weather" (Kathleen Brennan, Tom Waits) – 5:12
 "Guilt" (Barry Reynolds) – 7:51
 "Working Class Hero" (John Lennon) – 6:07
 "Sister Morphine" (Marianne Faithfull, Mick Jagger, Keith Richards) – 7:25
 "As Tears Go By" (Jagger, Andrew Loog Oldham, Richards) – 4:25
 "Why'd Ya Do It?" (Faithfull, Reynolds, Terry Stannard, Heathcote Williams, Steve York) – 6:31
 "When I Find My Life" (Faithfull, Reynolds) – 2:59
 "The Ballad of Lucy Jordan" (Shel Silverstein) – 5:08
 "Times Square" (Reynolds, Faithfull) – 4:57
 "Blazing Away" (Faithfull, Reynolds) – 4:10
 "She Moved Through the Fair" (Traditional; arranged by Marianne Faithfull) – 2:09
 "Broken English" (Faithfull, Joe Maverty, Reynolds, Stannard, York) – 7:37

Track listing of concert

"Les Prisons du Roy"
"Falling from Grace"
"The Blue Millionaire" 
"Strange Weather"
"Guilt"
"Sister Morphine"
"Working Class Hero"
"When I Find My Life"
"The Ballad of Lucy Jordan"
"As Tears Go By"
"Why D'Ya Do It?"
"Boulevard of Broken Dreams"
"Broken English"
"Times Square"

Personnel
Marianne Faithfull – vocals
Barry Reynolds – guitar, backing vocals (tracks 1–10, 12 & 13), musical director, associate producer
Marc Ribot – guitar (tracks 1–10, 12 & 13)
Garth Hudson – keyboards, accordion (tracks 1–10, 12 & 13)
Lew Soloff – trumpet, flugelhorn (tracks 1–10, 12 & 13)
Mac Rebennack – piano (track 10)
Fernando Saunders – bass, backing vocals, guitar
Dougie Bowne (tracks 1–10, 12 & 13), Charley Drayton (track 11) – drums
Kevin Savanger – keyboards (track 11)
Don Alias – percussion (track 11)
Gib Wharton – pedal steel guitar (track 11)
Nelson Stump – cowbell, kick drum (track 14)
Technical
Kevin Patrick – executive producer
Joe Ferla – engineer, mixing
Tony Wright – art direction, cover artwork
Dana Shimizu – design
George DuBose – cover photography

References

Island Records live albums
Marianne Faithfull live albums
1990 live albums
Albums produced by Hal Willner